Place du Commerce may refer to
 Place du Commerce in Paris
 Place du Commerce shopping centre on Nuns' Island